Tzantzismo was a cultural movement in the 1960s, Ecuador. It was founded in Quito in 1962 by Marco Muñoz and Ulises Estrella, and joined by other members throughout the 1960s. They were greatly influenced by other Ecuadorian intellectuals such as Jorge Enrique Adoum, César Dávila Andrade and Agustin Cueva. Tzantzismo was mainly expressed in poetry, and to a lesser extent in stories and theater. This literary revolutionary movement arose in response to a supposed degradation and gentrification in Ecuadorian literature.

Its members, called Tzántzicos, wore long, unkempt beards, as a symbolic tribute to Fidel Castro, and also grew their hair long and wore jeans. They began gathering at the home of the painter Eliza Aliz (birth name Elizabeth Rumazo) and her husband the Cuban painter Rene Aliz. Later the Tzántzicos would meet on Friday nights at the Café Aguila de Oro, which they renamed "77 Café", to have discussions on poetry, politics and other cultural matters.

In 1962, Estrella and the Argentine poet Leandro Katz co-authored a poetry book titled "Clamor", which marked the birth of Tzantzismo.  The first Tzántzico Manifesto was signed on August 27, 1962, by Marco Muñoz, Alfonso Murriagui, Simón Corral, Teodoro Murillo, Euler Granda and Ulises Estrella.

Tzántzicos  had a revolutionary attitude in their art as well as in politics. One of the main representatives of the movement is probably Raúl Arias, whose poetry collection Poesia en bicicleta is considered one of the best examples of Tzantzismo. The movement dissolved in 1969, particularly due to ideological differences between its founders. The term tzántzico comes from the Shuar language: “maker of tzantzas”, which means to cut off and shrink an enemy's head and show it off as a sign of victory and power.

List of notable Tzántzicos
 Abdón Ubidia
 Agustín Cueva
 Alejandro Moreano
 Alfonso Murriágui (1929)
 Álvaro Juan Félix
 Antonio Ordóñez (1946)
 Bolívar Echeverría
 Euler Granda (1935)
 Fernando Tinajero
 Francisco Proaño Arandi
 Humberto Vinueza
 Iván Carvajal (1948)
 Iván egüez
 José Ron
 José Corral
 Leandro Katz
 Luis Corral
 Marco Muñoz
 Marco Velasco
 Rafael Larrea
 Raúl Arias
 Simón Corral (1946)
 Sonia Romo Verdesoto, the movement's only female member.
 Teodoro Murillo (1944)
 Ulises Estrella (1939)

Sources

Ecuadorian culture
Ecuadorian literature
Literary movements
1960s in Ecuador